Pycnarmon fulvomarginalis is a moth in the family Crambidae. It was described by Pagenstecher in 1900. It is found in Papua New Guinea, where it has been recorded from the Duke of York Islands, as well as on New Britain.

References

Spilomelinae
Moths described in 1900
Moths of Oceania